Gerald Foster may refer to:

 G. C. Foster (1885–1966), Jamaican sportsman
 Gerald Foster (painter) (1900–1987), American painter